Follow Me Down may refer to:

 "Follow Me Down" (3OH!3 song), 2010
 "Follow Me Down" (The Pretty Reckless song), 2014
 Follow Me Down (album), a 2011 album by Sarah Jarosz